Laccophilus ceylonicus, is a species of predaceous diving beetle found in India and Sri Lanka.

Description
This elongate oval, medium-sized beetle has a typical body length is about 3.8 to 4.1 mm. Apical part of median lobe is narrow with a pointed tip. Sub-basal with testaceous band which is sinuous, narrow, and well separated from elytral base. Apical part of median lobe in lateral view with distinct bulge on dorsum.

References 

Dytiscidae
Insects of Sri Lanka
Insects described in 1919